John Maynard Smith  (6 January 1920 – 19 April 2004) was a British theoretical and mathematical evolutionary biologist and geneticist. Originally an aeronautical engineer during the Second World War, he took a second degree in genetics under the well-known biologist J. B. S. Haldane. Maynard Smith was instrumental in the application of game theory to evolution with George R. Price, and theorised on other problems such as the evolution of sex and signalling theory.

Biography

Early years
John Maynard Smith was born in London, the son of the surgeon Sidney Maynard Smith, but following his father's death in 1928, the family moved to Exmoor, where he became interested in natural history. Quite unhappy with the lack of formal science education at Eton College, Maynard Smith took it upon himself to develop an interest in Darwinian evolutionary theory and mathematics, after having read the work of old Etonian J. B. S. Haldane, whose books were in the school's library despite the bad reputation Haldane had at Eton for his communism. He became an atheist at age 14.

On leaving school, Maynard Smith joined the Communist Party of Great Britain and started studying engineering at Trinity College, Cambridge. When the Second World War broke out in 1939, he defied his party's line and volunteered for service. He was rejected, however, because of poor eyesight and was told to finish his engineering degree, which he did in 1941. He later quipped that "under the circumstances, my poor eyesight was a selective advantage—it stopped me getting shot". The year of his graduation, he married Sheila Matthew, and they later had two sons and one daughter (Tony, Carol, and Julian). Between 1942 and 1947, he applied his degree to military aircraft design.

Second degree
Maynard Smith, having decided that aircraft were "noisy and old-fashioned", then took a change of career, entering University College London to study fruit fly genetics under Haldane. After graduating he became a lecturer in zoology at his alma mater between 1952 and 1965, where he directed the Drosophila lab and conducted research on population genetics. He published a popular Penguin book, The Theory of Evolution, in 1958 (with subsequent editions in 1966, 1975, 1993).

He became gradually less attracted to communism and became a less active member, finally leaving the party in 1956 like many other intellectuals, after the Soviet Union brutally suppressed the Hungarian Revolution (Haldane had left the party in 1950 after becoming similarly disillusioned). He also admitted that a research program in evolutionary biology explicitly informed by Marxism seemed to bear little fruit.

University of Sussex
In 1962 he was one of the founding members of the University of Sussex and was a dean between 1965–85. He subsequently became a professor emeritus. Prior to his death the building housing much of life sciences at Sussex was renamed the John Maynard Smith Building in his honour.

Evolution and the Theory of Games
In 1973 Maynard Smith formalised a central concept in evolutionary game theory called the evolutionarily stable strategy, based on a verbal argument by George R. Price. This area of research culminated in his 1982 book Evolution and the Theory of Games. The Hawk-Dove game is arguably his single most influential game theoretical model.

He was elected a Fellow of the Royal Society in 1977. In 1986 he was awarded the Darwin Medal.

Evolution of sex and other major transitions in evolution
Maynard Smith published a book titled The Evolution of Sex which explored in mathematical terms, the notion of the "two-fold cost of sex". During the late 1980s he also became interested in evolutionary transitions in individuality (ETIs) and worked with the evolutionary biologist Eörs Szathmáry. Together they wrote an influential 1995 book The Major Transitions in Evolution, a seminal work which continues to contribute to ongoing issues in evolutionary biology. A popular science version of the book, The Origins of Life: From the birth of life to the origin of language, was published in 1999.

In 1991 he was awarded the Balzan Prize for genetics and evolution "for his powerful analysis of evolutionary theory and of the role of sexual reproduction as a critical factor in evolution and in the survival of species; for his mathematical models applying the theory of games to evolutionary problems" (motivation of the Balzan General Prize Committee). In 1995 he was awarded the Linnean Medal by the Linnean Society and in 1999 he was awarded the Crafoord Prize jointly with Ernst Mayr and George C. Williams. In 2001 he was awarded the Kyoto Prize.

In his honour the European Society for Evolutionary Biology has an award for extraordinary young evolutionary biology researchers named The John Maynard Smith Prize.

Animal Signals
His final book, Animal Signals, co-authored with David Harper, on signalling theory was published in 2003.

Death
He died on 19 April 2004 sitting in a chair at home, surrounded by books. He is survived by his wife Sheila and their children.

Controversy 
Maynard Smith was indirectly accused of plagiarism by another evolutionary biologist, William Donald Hamilton, when in 1964 Hamilton tried to publish in Nature a synthesis of an article he had submitted for publication in another journal, The Journal of Theoretical Biology. The Nature article was rejected, Maynard Smith being the reviewer of it. In March of that year, Maynard Smith published the article "Group Selection and Kin selection", which covered concepts from the article previously sent by Hamilton to Nature and which was finally published in The Journal of Theoretical Biology in July, a few months after Maynard Smith's publication. Maynard Smith was accused of taking advantage of that to exploit Hamilton's ideas. After this, Maynard Smith and Hamilton had a tense dispute and a series of public correspondences that would last for years, reaching its peak when Maynard Smith reminded New Scientist readers in the 1970s that his own mentor, J.B.S. Haldane, had talked about the basic mathematics of inclusive fitness after, as he said, "doing some work on the back of an envelope". Hamilton replied that Maynard Smith made up that anecdote and others to discredit him.

Legacy
The John Maynard Smith Archive is housed at the British Library (Add MS 86569-86840). The papers can be accessed through the British Library catalogue.

Awards and fellowships
 Fellow, Royal Society (1977)
 Member, American Academy of Arts and Sciences (1977)
 Member, American Philosophical Society (1980)
 Member, United States National Academy of Sciences (1982)
 Darwin Medal (1986)
 Frink Medal (1990)
 Balzan Prize (1991)
 Linnean Medal (1995)
 Royal Medal (1997)
 Crafoord Prize (1999)
 Copley Medal (1999)
 Kyoto Prize (2001)
 Darwin–Wallace Award (2008).  This used to be bestowed every 50 years by the Linnean Society of London; Maynard Smith was one of thirteen co-recipients, and one of only two recipients ever awarded post-mortem. Since 2010, the medal has been awarded annually.

Publications
 Maynard Smith, J. (1958). The Theory of Evolution. London, Penguin Books. 
 1993 edn 
 Maynard Smith, J. (1968) Mathematical Ideas in Biology. Cambridge University Press. 
 Maynard Smith, J. (1972) On Evolution. Edinburgh University Press. 
 
 Maynard Smith, J. (1974b) Models in Ecology. Cambridge University Press. 
 Maynard Smith, J. (1978d) The Evolution of Sex. Cambridge University Press. 
 Maynard Smith, J. (ed.) (1981d) Evolution Now. London, Macmillan. 
 Maynard Smith, J. (1982d) Evolution and the Theory of Games. Cambridge University Press. 
 Maynard Smith, J. (1986b) The Problems of Biology. Oxford: Oxford University Press. 
 Maynard Smith, J. (1988a) Did Darwin Get it Right?: Essays on Games, Sex and Evolution. London, Chapman & Hall. 
 Maynard Smith, J. (1989a) Evolutionary Genetics. Oxford: Oxford University Press. 
 Maynard Smith, J. and Szathmáry, E. (1997) The Major Transitions in Evolution. New York: Oxford University Press. 
 Maynard Smith, J. and Szathmáry, E. (1999) The Origins of Life: From the Birth of Life to the Origin of Language. Oxford: Oxford University Press. 
 Maynard Smith, J. and Harper, D. (2003) Animal Signals. Oxford University Press.

Notes

References

External links

University of Sussex
 Press release announcing his death
 Tribute from his colleagues 
 List of publications

Media
 Freeview video 'The Origin of Life', A Royal Institution Discourse by the Vega Science Trust
 Freeview video 'Flight in Birds and Aeroplanes', a Masterclass by the Vega Science Trust
 In conversation with John Maynard Smith FRS
 Five short videos
 John Maynard Smith telling his life story at Web of Stories (video)
 Interview of Smith by Robert Wright on MeaningofLife.tv (56min video)

Obituaries
 Guardian
 The Times
 Corante
 John Maynard Smith 1920–2004 by Marek Kohn
 Los Angeles Times
 New York Times
 DRAFT for Biology and Philosophy by Daniel Dennett
 Ciência Hoje (28/6/2004) (In Portuguese)

1920 births
2004 deaths
20th-century English mathematicians
21st-century English mathematicians
Academics of the University of Sussex
Academics of University College London
Alumni of Trinity College, Cambridge
Alumni of University College London
British communists
British evolutionary biologists
British science writers
Deaths from lung cancer in England
English atheists
English biologists
English geneticists
English humanists
Fellows of the Royal Society
Foreign associates of the National Academy of Sciences
Game theorists
Kyoto laureates in Basic Sciences
Linnean Medallists
Modern synthesis (20th century)
People educated at Eton College
Population geneticists
Recipients of the Copley Medal
Royal Medal winners
Theoretical biologists
Writers from London
Presidents of the Cambridge Union
20th-century biologists
Members of the American Philosophical Society